The 1936 Governor General's Awards for Literary Merit inaugurated Canada's annual program of Governor General's Awards, late in 1937 recognizing 1936 publications. There were only two categories, fiction and non-fiction, English language only.

The awards were presented by Lord Tweedsmuir, then Governor General of Canada—and, as John Buchan, the noted author of The Thirty-Nine Steps (1915, adapted as a 1935 film by Alfred Hitchcock).

Winners

 Fiction: Bertram Brooker, Think of the Earth
 Non-fiction: Thomas Beattie Roberton, TBR: Newspaper Pieces

References

External links
 

Governor General's Awards
Governor General's Awards
Governor